DWAV (89.1 FM) - broadcasting as Wave 89.1 - is a radio station owned and operated by Blockbuster Broadcasting System, a member of Tiger 22 Media. The station's studio is located at the Unit 906-B Paragon Plaza, EDSA corner Reliance St., Mandaluyong, while its transmitter is located at Palos Verdes Executive Village, Brgy. Sta. Cruz, Sumulong Highway, Antipolo, Rizal.

History

1975–1989: KB
Known as DWKB-FM (KB 89.1) owned by the Intercontinental Broadcasting Corporation, the station first aired in 1975 and in a short time, became one of the country's most listened to easy listening FM music stations.

1989–2001: 89 DMZ
The station later rebranded as 89 DMZ (it also changed its callsign to DZMZ-FM), which played dance, hip hop and remixed music. The late rapper, Francis Magalona, worked with the station through his program, "The Word-up Show", which aired on Saturday nights. It also became the home of the "Mobile Circuit".

2001–present: Wave
In 2001, IBC and Blockbuster Broadcasting System went into a government-sponsored bidding and the Vera Group, through Blockbuster Broadcasting System, won the rights to the frequency and the facilities (callsign then changed to DWAV). However, the network still shares its transmission facilities of IBC 13 until 2014 when it began transmitting from Antipolo.

Wave 89.1 began regular operations shortly on March 1, 2001. Managed by former Magic 89.9 jock Rolando Sulit a.k.a. Joe D'Mango, the station began its operations with an urban AC format. Some months later, its programming gradually shifted to full pop/R&B.

In 2007, Gary Caoili took over the management of the station after Sulit departed his management duties for both Wave and sister station Jam 88.3 (and subsequently transferred to ABS-CBN before migrating to Australia for good). A year later, after the demise of Blazin' 105.9, the station shifted to Urban Contemporary, playing more Hip Hop and R&B.

From 2010 to 2014, the station has been known for hosting the Urban Music Awards.

Since 2015, former Magic and Max FM station manager Nelson Capulso ("Sgt. Pepper"/"The Sarge") has been the station manager of Wave 89.1.

Compilations CDs of Wave 89.1
Dream Sounds (MCA Music Philippines, 2002)
Dream Sounds 2 (MCA Music Philippines, 2003)
Dream Sounds 3 (EMI Music Philippines, 2005)
Feel Good Fridays (EMI Music Philippines, 2006)
MYMP: New Horizon (Ivory Music, 2006) (in collaboration with Magic 89.9, Jam 88.3, 90.7 Love Radio & Yes! FM 101.1)
Freestyle: Back at the Yard (Viva Records, 2007) (in collaboration with Magic 89.9)
Soul Obsessions: Duets with Thor (Ivory Music, 2007)
Nyoy Volante: Heartstrings (Vicor Music Corp., 2008)
MYMP: Now (Ivory Music, 2008) (in collaboration with Jam 88.3, 90.7 Love Radio & Yes! FM 101.1)
Six O Slow/The Quiet Storm Album (MCA Music Philippines, 2009)
Nina - Renditions of the Soul (Warner Music Philippines, 2009)
Freestyle: Playlist (Viva Records, 2009) (in collaboration with Magic 89.9, Jam 88.3 & 99.5 RT)
Princess Velasco: Addicted to Acoustic (Viva Records, 2009) (in collaboration with Jam 88.3 & Mellow 947)

References

External links
 Wave 891 official website
 Urban Music Awards

DWAV
Radio stations in Metro Manila
Radio stations established in 1975
Tiger 22 Media Corporation